"The Tunnel under the World" is a science fiction short story by American writer Frederik Pohl. It was first published in 1955 in Galaxy magazine. It has often been anthologized, most notably in The Golden Age of Science Fiction, edited by Kingsley Amis (1981).

Plot
Guy and Mary Burckhardt wake up in their house in Tylerton on June 15, having both had terrible nightmares, but they cannot recall the events of their dreams. Guy dismisses the dream and goes to work as usual, the downtown offices of Contro Chemicals, which operates a highly automated and robot-staffed petrochemicals plant. But something is not right; he is surrounded everywhere by loud and all-pervasive advertising jingles for everything from cigarettes to freezers.

A colleague named Swanson tries to speak to him but apparently does not get the desired reaction from Burckhardt and leaves. Burckhardt goes home, but the next morning, he awakes having had the same nightmare, still on June 15. He has the same experience with Swanson.

That evening, Burckhardt discovers that his cellar has seemingly been dismantled and "rebuilt", in a way he does not recognize. While investigating he falls asleep, spending the entire night in the cellar. The next morning is June 15 again. Swanson again speaks to Burckhardt at work, and Burckhardt asks why he keeps approaching him in this way. Swanson hustles him away to the empty halls of the chemical plant. Hiding in a room at the end of a long tunnel, he explains that everyone in town seems to lose the last day of their memory each night when they sleep, unless they sleep in a hidden location as Swanson has been doing.  He theorises that an invader has taken over the town for unknown reasons.

He proves to be incorrect. In actuality, the chemical plant had exploded, killing all the inhabitants of Tylerton. A ruthless advertising executive, Dorchin, took over the ruins and rebuilt the town in miniature. The dead people's memories and personalities were read from their brains and copied into minuscule robots, which are being used as captive subjects for testing high pressure advertising campaigns.  Each night, the power is cut and Dorchin's employees manually reset each robot's memory in preparation for the next experiment.

Radio, TV, and film versions
Over the years, the story has been adapted for other media several times, including:
 Two radio adaptations of "Tunnel Under the World" were broadcast as episodes of X Minus One.
 It was produced by the BBC as a 1966 series 2 episode of the anthology series Out of the Unknown. It is one of only four episodes from the thirteen episode season to survive.
 The story was the basis for the Italian surrealist film, Il tunnel sotto il mondo (1969).
 The story inspired the French student short film, "Le 15 Mai" (1969), the directorial debut of Claire Denis.
 An American TV movie, Virtual Nightmare (2000) was loosely based on the story.

References

External links
 
 
 FrederikPohl.com, the author's website
 X Minus One episode at the Internet Archive
  

Science fiction short stories
1955 short stories